The Critics' Choice Television Award for Best Supporting Actor in a Drama Series is one of the award categories presented annually by the Critics' Choice Television Awards (BTJA) to recognize the work done by television actors. It was introduced in 2011 when the event was first initiated. The winners are selected by a group of television critics that are part of the Broadcast Television Critics Association.

Winners and nominees

2010s

2020s

Performers with multiple wins
2 wins
 Giancarlo Esposito

Performers with multiple nominations
4 nominations
 Peter Dinklage
 Walton Goggins
 Justin Hartley
3 nominations
 Jonathan Banks
 Asia Kate Dillon
 John Lithgow
2 nominations
 Billy Crudup 
 Christopher Eccleston
 Noah Emmerich
 Giancarlo Esposito
 Delroy Lindo
 Matthew Macfadyen
 Michael McKean
 John Noble
 Mandy Patinkin 
 Aaron Paul
 Christian Slater
 John Slattery
 Jon Voight

Programmes with multiple nominations
6 nominations
 Game of Thrones
5 nominations
 Better Call Saul
 Justified
4 nominations
 Breaking Bad
 The Good Fight
 This Is Us 
 Succession
3 nominations
 Billions
 Mr. Robot
2 nominations
 The Americans
 Boardwalk Empire
 The Crown
 Fringe
 The Good Wife
 The Leftovers
 Mad Men
 The Morning Show
 Ray Donovan
 Southland

See also
 TCA Award for Individual Achievement in Drama
 Primetime Emmy Award for Outstanding Supporting Actor in a Drama Series
 Golden Globe Award for Best Supporting Actor – Series, Miniseries or Television Film

Notes

References

External links
 

Critics' Choice Television Awards
Television awards for Best Supporting Actor